Mako is a template library written in Python. Mako is an embedded Python (i.e. Python Server Page) language, which refines the familiar ideas of componentized layout and inheritance. The Mako template is used by Reddit.  It is the default template language included with the Pylons and Pyramid web frameworks.

See also 
 CheetahTemplate
 Genshi
 Jinja

References

External links 
 
 Mako on PyPI
 

Python (programming language) libraries
Template engines